Cavez Bridge is a medieval bridge that crosses the Tâmega River, located in Cavez, Braga District, in Portugal. The bridge was classified as a National Monument in 1910. It features five uneven arches, with cutwaters in the pillars.

See also
List of bridges in Portugal

References

Sources
 

Tamega
Cabeceiras de Basto
Bridges completed in the 13th century
National monuments in Braga District
Listed bridges in Portugal